This is a list of Number 1 hit singles in 1960 in New Zealand, starting with the first chart dated, 21 July 1960 from the Lever Hit Parade.

Summary

Chart

References

 
  Number One Singles Of 1960

1960 in New Zealand
1960 record charts
1960
1960s in New Zealand music